Halina Maria Bieda (born 6 October 1962 in Chorzów) is a Polish politician. She was elected to the Senate of Poland (10th term) representing the constituency of Katowice.

References 

1962 births
Living people
People from Chorzów
Civic Platform politicians
Members of the Senate of Poland 2019–2023
Women members of the Senate of Poland
20th-century Polish women politicians
21st-century Polish women politicians
Recipients of the Bronze Cross of Merit (Poland)